Hokum Rock is a glacial erratic boulder left by the last retreating ice age glacier, The Laurentine Ice Sheet, 20,000 to 12,000 years ago, when Cape Cod was formed. Hokum Rock is the second largest erratic on the Cape. The largest is Doane Rock at Cape Cod National Seashore in Eastham. Hokum Rock is in Dennis Barnstable County, Massachusetts. Black Ball Hill is located west and Scargo Hill is located northwest of Hokum Rock.

References

Mountains of Massachusetts
Mountains of Barnstable County, Massachusetts